Thulêan Mysteries is the twelfth and final studio album by Norwegian musical project Burzum, released on 13 March 2020 through Byelobog Productions. It is a double album, comprising the sporadic and random tracks written and recorded by Varg Vikernes since 2014's The Ways of Yore.

Recorded as a soundtrack to Vikernes' role-playing game MYFAROG, the album follows the medieval/dark ambient musical style of the previous albums. Vikernes said of Thulêan Mysteries: "Since my true passion has never been music, but actually tabletop role-playing games, I figured I should make this an album intended for that use; as background music for my own MYFAROG (Mythic Fantasy Role-playing Game)."The album's artwork is by Norwegian artist Theodor Kittelsen called "Nøkken".

The song "The Loss of Thulê" is a re-recorded version of the song "The Crying Orc" (from Burzum's 1992 album Burzum, which also has another re-recorded version "Der weinende Hadnur" from Burzum's 1999 album Hliðskjálf) and the song "Skin Traveller" is a re-recorded version of the song "Han som reiste" (from Burzum's 1993 album Det som engang var).

Track listing

Personnel 
 Varg Vikernes – all instruments, vocals

References

External links
Thulêan Mysteries on Burzum's official website

2020 albums
Burzum albums